EvilleCon is an annual three day anime convention held during March at the Old National Events Plaza in Evansville, Indiana.

Programming
The convention typically offers animation screenings, cosplay chess, costume contests, dancing, demonstrations, guests, karaoke, lessons, merchandise vendors, movies, music, panel discussions, tabletop games, and video games.

History
EvilleCon started in 2009 as a one-day free anime convention created by Otona no Otaku and Otaku Anonymous anime and manga clubs at the Evansville Central Library. The convention in 2010 began charging for admission, became two days, and changed locations to The Centre. For 2011, the convention moved to the Holiday Inn Evansville Airport Hotel, changed dates to April, and expanded to three days. For 2012 & 2013, the convention stayed in the same location with similar dates. The convention in 2015 was held at the Old National Events Plaza. In 2017, EvilleCon moved to the Holiday Inn Evansville Airport. EvilleCon 2020 was cancelled due to the COVID-19 pandemic. EvilleCon 2021 was also cancelled due to the COVID-19 pandemic.

Event history

References

External links
EvilleCon Website

Anime conventions in the United States
Recurring events established in 2009
2009 establishments in Indiana
Annual events in Indiana
Festivals in Evansville, Indiana
Conventions in Indiana